Anan Hohsuwan (born 16 August 1966) is a Thai windsurfer. He competed in the men's Division II event at the 1988 Summer Olympics.

References

External links
 
 

1966 births
Living people
Anan Hohsuwan
Anan Hohsuwan
Anan Hohsuwan
Sailors at the 1988 Summer Olympics – Division II
Southeast Asian Games medalists in sailing
Competitors at the 1987 Southeast Asian Games
Place of birth missing (living people)